Eduardo González Viaña (born November 13, 1941, in Chepén, La Libertad, Peru) is a writer and professor of Spanish at Western Oregon University.

González Viaña earned a doctorate in Spanish language literature from the National University of Trujillo in Peru, where he also earned a law degree. He moved to the United States in 1990 to become a visiting professor at the University of California, Berkeley. In 1994, he joined the faculty at Western Oregon University where he teaches Spanish language, literature and history.

In 1999, González Viaña was awarded the Juan Rulfo Award for best short stories for the short piece "Siete Noches en California." His novels include Sarita Colonia viene volando (1987), El tiempo del amor (1984), Los sueños de América (2001), Vallejo en los infiernos (2008), and El corrido de Dante (2008).

Publications
 American Dreams, Arte Público Press, 2005. (English translation by Heather Moore Cantarero)
 Dante's Ballad, Arte Público Press, 2007. (English translation by Susan Giersbach Rascon)
 El amor de Carmela me va a matar, Axiara Editions, 2010.

See also
North Group

References

1941 births
Peruvian novelists
Peruvian male writers
National University of Trujillo alumni
Western Oregon University faculty
Living people
North Group (Trujillo)
Male novelists
People from Chepén Province